B&F System, Inc. (BNFUSA) is a wholesaler and drop ship supplier established in the Dallas, Texas area and founded in 1950. The company imports directly from  affiliated factories. In addition to selling to independent retailers, B&F also sells to certain Fortune 500 companies and some of the nation's largest retailers. Their merchandise focuses on accessories such as clothing; handbags; jewelry; and knives. It is one of the sources for many sellers on eBay due to its drop shipping option.

See also
Wholesale
Distribution business

References

External links
Official website

Business services companies established in 1950
Companies based in Dallas
Wholesalers of the United States
1950 establishments in Texas